Trent Woods is a town in Craven County, North Carolina, United States. The population was 4,155 in 2010. It is part of the New Bern, North Carolina Metropolitan Statistical Area.

History
The Dr. Earl S. Sloan House was listed on the National Register of Historic Places in 1986.

Geography

Demographics

2020 census

As of the 2020 United States census, there were 4,074 people, 1,644 households, and 1,346 families residing in the town.

2000 census
As of the census of 2000, there were 4,192 people, 1,692 households, and 1,360 families residing in the town. The population density was 1,429.6 people per square mile (552.4/km2). There were 1,744 housing units at an average density of 594.7 per square mile (229.8/km2). The racial makeup of the town was 97.61% White, 1.07% African American, 0.38% Asian, 0.02% Pacific Islander, 0.60% from other races, and 0.31% from two or more races. Hispanic or Latino of any race were 0.64% of the population.

There were 1,692 households, out of which 31.3% had children under the age of 18 living with them, 73.2% were married couples living together, 5.6% had a female householder with no husband present, and 19.6% were non-families. 17.8% of all households were made up of individuals, and 10.5% had someone living alone who was 65 years of age or older. The average household size was 2.48 and the average family size was 2.80.

In the town, the population was spread out, with 23.8% under the age of 18, 2.9% from 18 to 24, 20.8% from 25 to 44, 30.5% from 45 to 64, and 22.1% who were 65 years of age or older. The median age was 47 years. For every 100 females, there were 92.5 males. For every 100 females age 18 and over, there were 88.4 males.

The median income for a household in the town was $63,482, and the median income for a family was $71,336. Males had a median income of $49,219 versus $35,224 for females. The per capita income for the town was $36,690. About 1.4% of families and 2.1% of the population were below the poverty line, including 1.9% of those under age 18 and none of those age 65 or over.

References

External links
 

New Bern micropolitan area
Populated places established in 1959
Populated places on the Trent River (North Carolina)
Towns in Craven County, North Carolina
Towns in North Carolina